Big Guy and Rusty the Boy Robot, also known as The Big Guy and Rusty, is an American animated TV series based on the comic book of the same name by Frank Miller and Geof Darrow.

The series ran for 26 episodes and featured the voice of Pamela Adlon (credited as Pamela Segall) as the voice of Rusty, Jonathan David Cook as Big Guy, and the voices of Gabrielle Carteris, Stephen Root, Kathy Kinney, Kevin Michael Richardson, M. Emmet Walsh, and R. Lee Ermey. A line of toys based on the show was produced by Bandai, along with ephemera surrounding a brief promotional tie-in with Burger King.

26 episodes were produced for the Fox Kids Network's Saturday morning lineup, but the channel cancelled the show after six episodes. The show premiered on September 18, 1999, and ended on October 23. This left twenty episodes unaired for more than a year. Starting in January 2001, Fox Kids added the show to its weekday-afternoon  block, and aired all twenty-six existing episodes. The entire series was later broadcast on ABC Family in 2002.

On July 12, 2016, Amazon released the complete series on DVD-R.

Overview
The animated series, produced by Columbia TriStar Television and Dark Horse Entertainment, aired from 1999 to 2001, and in many aspects is a more mature and established series. Whereas the comic book seems like only an introduction to the robots, the animated series is full-fledged with a strong back story which links the episodes together. The plot and setting of the series is different from the comic book as the whole story is based around New Tronic City, a fictional North American city clearly modeled after New York City.

Plot
The series focuses on Rusty, the most advanced robot ever built, with a human emotional grid and "nucleoprotonic" powers. The plan by Quark Industries is that Rusty will replace the Big Guy, a massive war robot that is the Earth's last line of defence against all threats alien or domestic. However, Rusty is too inexperienced to stand up against these said threats alone, so the Big Guy is re-commissioned to teach Rusty the way of trade. Rusty idolizes the Big Guy, regarding him as the best robot ever. In reality, the Big Guy is actually a mindless battle suit piloted by lieutenant Dwayne Hunter, who poses as his chief mechanic. The Big Guy's secret is known only to a few and many situations involve Hunter's clever and impromptu excuses to hide the fact from Rusty for two reasons; that the truth could overload Rusty's emotional grid and Rusty has difficulty keeping secrets.

Characters
 Rusty (voiced by Pamela Adlon) - Quark Industries's intended replacement for the Big Guy, a robot with real artificial intelligence and powered by nucleoprotons. However, Rusty is far too inexperienced to face the threats that the Big Guy normally handles, so he is relegated to being Big Guy's sidekick and trainee. He idolizes Big Guy, but is unaware that his hero is actually a human inside a metal suit. He has a very childish and toylike look, including his size which makes him physically unimpressive, though he's in fact very powerful and impervious to most damage. His behavior also resembles that of a human child, quite immature with strong emotional reactions. However, Rusty does at times give his hero an emotional boost in morale. Despite his overall child mentality, it's generally unwise to trifle with him (partly because of his physical power); it may take a while, but the boy robot does make evildoers pay. He initially had a bit of a problem of handling the recoil of his nucleoproton blasts, and regularly got knocked down afterwards or shot the wrong target, but after some practice learned to compensate for the recoil. "No pain receptors" is a typical catchphrase when Rusty is "crushed" to the ground or against a wall without being damaged.
 Big Guy (voiced by Jonathan David Cook) - Designated as the BGY-11, the so-called "robot" champion of Earth was actually a heavily armed battle suit, piloted by Lieutenant Dwayne Hunter. When Quark Industries failed to produce an actual robot with artificial intelligence, the solution was to use a human pilot. As Hunter puts it, the Big Guy was nothing more than a fancy tank. Big Guy is roughly 30 feet tall (when you see it interacting with the environment, notably people), is able to fly thanks to rocket boots, possesses great strength and resilience (even though it has been seen damaged on more than one occasion) and is armed with a variety of integrated weaponry, including the signature fold-out guns in the elbow housings. Unlike Rusty, he is powered by a Cobalt/Thorium G Power Core. Always ready with a patriotic quip, Big Guy's personality is very different from that of his human pilot in real life. Contrary to Rusty, Big Guy needs a human pilot to make it work properly (except for a few exceptional cases), which can be a weakness during combat, especially if the enemy guesses Big Guy's true nature.
 Lieutenant Dwayne Hunter (voiced by Jim Hanks) - The Big Guy's pilot, a secret known only to a few, otherwise known as Big Guy's chief mechanic to those not in the know. He has a crush on Dr. Slate. While in Big Guy, Hunter typically will say "for the love of Mike" when exasperated, making it Big Guy's catchphrase per episode.
 Dr. Erika Slate (voiced by Gabrielle Carteris) - A scientist at Quark Industries, she developed Rusty's human emotional grid and acts like a mother to Rusty. She is one of the few who knows the Big Guy's secret, discovering so by accident when Rusty was looking for a Big Guy fansite and accidentally hacked into confidential files on Big Guy's creation. In one episode when Hunter is down, she pilots the Big Guy herself.
 Dr. Axel Donovan (voiced by Stephen Root) - The President of Quark Industries, a robotics firm. He is a caricature of capitalistic greed and moral cowardice. Dr. Donovan often provides comic relief.
 Pierre Donovan (voiced by Mary Kay Bergman) - The nephew of Dr. Donovan, a teenager physical copycat of his uncle, quite arrogant and manipulative but may have some technical skills related to robotics.
 R-G-B Robots - A trio of red, green, and blue robots that work for Dr. Donovan. Due to a corrupt code in their system, they fail at following the simplest of commands which ends with them getting wrecked. These robots are regularly destroyed (mostly by themselves), and rebuild without being improved, and like Axel Donovan are used for comic relief.
 Jenny the Monkey (voiced by Kathy Kinney) - A monkey who talks and usually sits on Dr. Donovan's shoulder while making fun of Quark's scientists and employees. She has a keen sense of self-preservation. In "Rumble in the Jungle," Jenny did have an origin on why she talked. Unfortunately, the viewers didn't get to know it because Big Guy attacked the villain who asked about her.
 Jo, Mack, and Garth (voiced by Pamela Adlon, M. Emmet Walsh, and Kevin Michael Richardson respectfully) - The Big Guy's pit crew and Dwayne's Hunter's friends. They serve on the aircraft carrier S.S. Dark Horse, which acts as Big Guy's base and stores his airship. When Rusty gained a new body and became Rus, Mack became his chief mechanic and was replaced by a by-the-book one. Mack and Rusty didn't get along well, but Mack rescued him after he was captured and gave him an improvised body to complete his mission. Afterwards Rusty rejoined Big Guy and Mack rejoined Big Guy's team.
 General Thornton (voiced by R. Lee Ermey) - A United States Army general who heads the government's BGY-11 Commission, that created the Big Guy. He helps keep the Big Guy's secret from Rusty and the others.

Villains

Apart from recurring and/or plot-important villains, a lot of monsters (often of unknown origin) can be seen in this anime but they play no particular role, or are an important element in only one episode.

 The Squillacci Empire - The very first villains seen in the anime, they are squid-like tentacled aliens who make crop circles, attempt to experiment on cows and other stereotypical alien actions. Their attempts to conquer the Earth have been repeatedly thwarted by the Big Guy. It is later revealed that, if not for the Big Guy, the Squillacci Empire would have ruled the earth. They once tried to conquer Earth during the Revolutionary War but were thwarted by Big Guy and Rusty. The battle was responsible for the crack in the Liberty Bell. They were presumably named for production team member Frank Squillace.
 Earl (voiced by Pamela Adlon) - The E.P 327. Early prototype of Rusty. Has an underdeveloped emotion grid and follows orders literally. Initially brought back online by Rusty for him to have a friend, but after he goes too far and blows the Big Guy's head off, Rusty fights him and manages to decapitate him and remove his powerpack. Later reactivated to download information with Rusty and ordered to follow Rusty's orders. Succeeds in his mission, but malfunctions when Rusty gives him an impossible order (to go hide in a corner when they were in a round room). This causes him to reset and go into defense mode, ignoring Rusty's commands. Once again, Rusty is forced to decapitate him.
 Legion Ex Machina - a name based on the Latin expression "Deus ex machina" - they are an enigmatic group of six very advanced robots who aim to destroy humanity and create a robot-heaven of "Robotopia". Their whereabouts and origin are unknown, yet their robotic design and function are very similar to the Big Guy. They are intelligent and human-like enough to be able to mingle with normal humans unnoticed with appropriate disguise. Though not meant for combat, they proved to be surprisingly strong, resilient and agile, far more than an ordinary human being. This presents an intriguing hook that ties the episodes together, with clues to their origin and their creator being revealed one by one. Ironically, they were created by the same man who originally led Big Guy's design. The show ended on a cliffhanger, where it is discovered that there is a seventh Legion Ex Machina that Big Guy and Rusty have yet to defeat. Even though they have different outer bodies all Legion Ex Machina have the same AI and the same Exoskeleton. Gilder was the only exception as he still had his emotion grid but was otherwise identical to the other members.
 Legion Ex Machina #1 (voiced by Clancy Brown) - The de facto leader of the group. He was the first of the legion to come online and can create complex tactics very quickly. He and the others would not hesitate to execute one of their own should one of them be inefficient or defective. He perished in the final battle at the lab, in "Double Time, part 2", thrown against and disintegrated by a powerful force field used to contain Big Guy and Rusty after being blasted by Big Guy's gun fired by his own creator. He is the sixth and the last member to be destroyed.
 Legion Ex Machina #2 & #3 (both voiced by Clancy Brown) - Since they both lacked emotions they are nearly identical other than their looks. They often disagree on things  and are often at each other's throats at times. However they are completely loyal to Legion Ex Machina #1 and would respect #!, although they are always seen as equals. Much like #1, they are willing to execute one of their own should one of them be inefficient or defective (such as Legion Ex Machina #4 and Legion Ex Machina #6). They perished in the final battle at the lab, in "Double Time, part 2". Legion Ex Machina #2 was destroyed by Rusty who dragged him into the blades of a gigantic fan which tore him to pieces. Legion Ex Machina #2 differed from the rest of the legion members by having a unique exoskeleton, appearing more skeletal and having telescopic, clawed arms. He is the fourth member to be destroyed. Legion Ex Machina #3 was destroyed when Big Guy pushed him and his combat armor into an acid-filled cauldron with the help of Rusty. He is the fifth member to be destroyed.
 Legion Ex Machina #4 (voiced by Clancy Brown) - He fights Big Guy and Rusty in the first time in "Little Boy Robot Lost", and is presumed destroyed but later is revealed still active in "The Bicameral Mind", thanks to #1, #2 and #3. He is The only one to develop an emotion grid. Legion Ex Machina #4 temporarily switched protocols with Rusty (whom he later developed a rivalry with), leading to his childish behavior in the episode "The Bicameral Mind". He would be captured by Rusty when their minds completely switched. Later in "Donovan's Brainiac", he would be placed in a toy robot when Dr. Donovan's nephew Pierre stole his brain. His exoskeleton was destroyed by a spider robot sent by #1, #2 and #3 to destroy him. He tried to contact the Legion only to find that he is to be executed. He would then try to fry the entire area by creating a nuclear fusion meltdown to avenge. Dr. Slate defused the reactor with Rusty's help and Big Guy activated his defense mechanism, destroying #4's brain. He is the third member to be destroyed.
 Legion Ex Machina #5 (voiced by Clancy Brown) - The first Legion member to meet the Big Guy. He was very similar to Legion Ex Machina #2 and #3. He took over a munitions factory and was destroyed when Big Guy threw him into liquid nitrogen, freezing him solid.  Rusty then shattered him, destroying him completely and somewhat annoying Big Guy as they could have studied him in "The Big Boy". He is the second member to be destroyed.
 Legion Ex Machina #6 (voiced by Dean Haglund) - Also known as Dr. Gilder, #6 was the only member whose emotion grid was fully intact. However his emotions are highly exaggerated and are considered by his peers as a weakness. He was sent to Quark Industries as a spy to gather blue prints and information on various Quark staff. He was first portrayed as a shy, weak if a bit disturbed scientist but was soon revealed as a Legion Ex Machina member. His emotions also changed to a sadistic and psychopathic killer. His exoskeleton was destroyed when it was dropped into a grinder by Big Guy in "The Reluctant Assassin". His brain was destroyed when Big Guy tried to access his memory files and triggered a self-defense program, detonating itself in "Really Big Guy". He is the first member to be destroyed and also gave the protagonists some clues on how to destroy Legion Ex Machina members (see #4's demise above).
 Legion Ex Machina #7 - Alluded to in the penultimate episode. Still at large.
 The Legion's creations - The creations of the Legion that fight Big Guy and Rusty.
 Argos - Two robots created by the Legion. The first - roughly the size of Big Guy with similar armament - was used as a weapon to attack the Legion's enemies. It was the first encounter with the Legion and it tried to turn Big Guy and Rusty over to the Legion's side but they refused. Powered by nucleoprotons and destroyed by Rusty when tricked into taking his overloading powerpack. Remains scrapped by the Legion at #6's orders. The second was much larger, roughly the size of a skyscraper, very tough but not meant for destruction. This one was so powerful it could take the best Big Guy and Rusty could hit it with and come out without a scratch, and even had some autorepairing systems. Due to Big Guy and Rusty getting its left hand, it was missing a hand. Inside the hand was a 500 megawatt Vortex Cannon. Was sent out to get New Tronic City's Micro Fusion Generator to power a new assembly line for Legion robots. Was destroyed by Joe who fired the Argo's own Vortex Cannon into it once Rusty retrieved the firing mechanism in the left wrist.
 The Eliminator - A heavily armed Quark Industries robot that Dr. Gilder/#6 hijacked in an effort to eliminate Donovan in revenge for the destruction of various robots he had created for Quark. It was subsequently defeated by Big Guy and the control drone implanted by Gilder discovered.
 Project Nova - A large three-legged robot armed with a powerful energy cannon; it was apparently designed and its development intended to be overseen by #4. However, during a mission to acquire fuel for its cannon, an attempt by Rusty to download information from the Legion's systems resulted in him and #4 switching some programming. As a result, Rusty drew up schematics for and built his own Nova, which came under the control of the Legion. It briefly engaged Big Guy but was later taken out of commission permanently by Rusty after he and #4 swapped their entire programming set, resulting in them switching bodies temporarily.
 Bad Guy - A fully robotic clone of Big Guy also known as the BGY-11X. Created to take Big Guy's place to infiltrate the military and Quark. It fights it out with Big Guy who proves to be no match for it, although both robots take heavy damage in the fight. The 11X is destroyed when it goes to use a massive cannon - a feature Big Guy lacks due to its cockpit - to destroy Big Guy. Lt. Hunter fires Big Guy's hand into the cannon, blocking the shot and causing an explosion that destroys Bad Guy.
 Lt. Hunter Clone - A robotic clone of Lt. Hunter sent to kidnap him and wipe out his mechanics and Doctor Slate. It was destroyed by Rusty, who threw it into a helicopter propeller, causing it to fall off Quark and crash into Donovan's new limo.
 Dr. Neugog (voiced by Tim Curry) - Hieronymous Neugog is a recurring villain in the series in that he appears in "The Big Scoop" and "Nephew of Neugog". In his first episode debut "The Big Scoop," Dr. Neugog (or just simply "Neugog" as he is called later) was a scientist working at Quark Industries who studied telepathy and the inner workings of the mind. Neugog created a machine known simply as the "Dynamo", which was designed to read the mind of whoever it was homed onto. Neugog attempted to impress the board of directors by reading the mind of a board member. At first, the machine fails miserably, and leaving Neugog merely guessing at what the board member was thinking. Determined not to fail, Neugog shifts the power of the Dynamo up as high as it can go. This appears to be successful, as he is able to read the board member's mind (telling him about his thought to put lotion on a rash he has because its "itching him like crazy!"). However, during the success, a spider falls into the machinery and mutates Neugog into a huge, spider-like monster with an oversized brain that actually protrudes from the back of his head. He gains the power to devour brains from living people (by use of a long, tentacle-like proboscis that emerges from his second mouth), also gaining all the knowledge they possess. When Neugog "feeds", the victim is put into a sort of comatose state where he or she is unable to speak, move, or think, just repeatedly uttering the same sounds "Duh, Guh, Uh"; though oddly this still works even with brief contact, such as with Dr. Slate. Neugog also gains the ability of telepathy along with an almost infinite bank of knowledge.

Episodes

Season 1 (1999)

Season 2 (2001)
Note that the episodes aired out of order. Following the production numbers in the final column presents the accurate sequence number. For instance, episode 124 "Rumble in the Jungle" was intended to air before the 2-part series finale, "Double Time".

Cast
 Pamela Segall as Rusty, Jo
 Jonathan David Cook as The Big Guy
 Gabrielle Carteris as Dr. Erika Slate
 Jim Hanks as Dwayne Hunter
 Stephen Root as Dr. Axel Donovan
 Kathy Kinney as Jenny the Monkey
 Kevin Michael Richardson as Garth
 M. Emmett Walsh as Mack
 R. Lee Ermey as Gen. Thorton

Additional voices
 Dee Bradley Baker
 Jillian Barberie
 Victor Brandt
 Clancy Brown as Legion Ex Machina #1as5
 Nancy Cartwright
 Tim Curry as Dr. Neugog (in "The Big Scoop," "Nephew of Neugog")
 Brian Doyle-Murray as Po the Obliterator (in "The Champ")
 Dean Haglund as Legion Ex Machina #6/Dr. Glider
 Jennifer Hale
 Sherman Howard
 Maurice LaMarche
 Kevin Schon

References

External links
 
 

Child superheroes
Fox Kids
Fox Broadcasting Company original programming
1990s American animated television series
2000s American animated television series
1999 American television series debuts
2001 American television series endings
First-run syndicated television programs in the United States
Television shows based on Dark Horse Comics
Television series by Sony Pictures Television
Animated television series about robots
Adaptations of works by Frank Miller
American children's animated science fiction television series
American children's animated superhero television series
Television series by Adelaide Productions